Alammelech is a Biblical place described in the Book of Joshua. It lies within Asher, between Achshaph and Amad.

References

Hebrew Bible places